The Matra Company's racing team, under the names of Matra Sports, Equipe Matra Elf and Equipe Matra Sports (after a takeover by Simca in 1969 as Matra-Simca Division Automobile), was formed in 1965 and based at Champagne-sur-Seine (1965–1967), Romorantin-Lanthenay (1967–1969) and Vélizy-Villacoublay (1969–1979). In 1979 the team was taken over by Peugeot and renamed as Automobiles Talbot.

Motorsports history
In the mid-1960s, Matra enjoyed considerable success in Formula 3 and F2 racing, particularly with the MS5 monocoque-based car, winning the French and European championships. In , Jacky Ickx surprised the F1 establishment by posting the third-fastest qualifying time of 8:14" at the German Nürburgring in his 1600cc Matra MS7 F2, which was allowed to enter alongside the 3000cc F1 cars. In the race, he failed to finish due to a broken suspension.

Matra entered Formula One in  when Jackie Stewart was a serious contender, winning several Grands Prix in the Tyrrell-run Matra MS10 which competed alongside the works team.

The F1 team was established at Vélizy-Villacoublay in the southwestern suburbs of Paris, France. The car's most innovative feature was the use of aviation-inspired structural fuel tanks. These allowed the chassis to be around  lighter, while still being stronger than its competitors.

Matra CEO Jean-Luc Lagardère made a strategic decision for the  championship: the Matra works team would not compete in Formula One. Matra would instead focus its efforts on Ken Tyrrell's privateer team (renamed Matra International) and build a new DFV powered car with structural fuel tanks, even though it would only be eligible for a single season. The decision was even more radical given that Matra was seeking a partnership with Simca, which would preclude using Ford-branded engines for the following year. Stewart won the 1969 title easily with the new Cosworth-powered Matra MS80, which was designed by Gérard Ducarouge and Bernard Boyer, and corrected most of the weaknesses of the MS10. Stewart's title was the first won in a car built by a French constructor, and still remains the only one won in a car built in France as well as in a car entered by a privateer team. It was a spectacular achievement from a constructor that had only entered Formula One the previous year. France became only the third country (after the United Kingdom and Italy) to have produced a winning constructor, and Matra became the only constructor to have won the Constructors' Championship without running its own works team.

Like Cosworth, Lotus and McLaren, Matra experimented with four wheel drive during the 1969 season. Johnny Servoz-Gavin became the one and only driver to score a point with a 4WD car, finishing sixth with the Matra MS84 at the Canadian Grand Prix. The MS84, along with Brabham's BT26A, was one of the last spaceframe cars to compete in Formula One.

For  following the agreement with Simca, Matra asked Tyrrell to use their V12 engine rather than the Cosworth. Stewart got to test the Matra V12, but since a large part of the Tyrrell budget was provided by Ford, and another significant sponsor was French state-owned petroleum company Elf, which had an agreement with Renault that precluded supporting a Simca partner, the partnership between Matra and Tyrrell ended.

Jacques Laffite´s victory at the 1977 Swedish Grand Prix was the first Formula One victory for a French team and a French engine, as well as the first all-French victory in the Formula One World Championship.

The company was also successful in endurance racing with cars powered by the V12 engine. The sportscar team was based at first at Vélizy-Villacoublay and then moved to Le Castellet, near Marseille, France.

The Matra MS670 won the 24 Hours of Le Mans in 1972, 1973, and 1974. It also delivered the World Championship for Makes to Matra in both 1973 and 1974.

Racing models
 Matra MS1
 Matra MS2
 Matra MS5
 Matra MS6
 Matra MS7
 Matra MS9
 Matra MS10
 Matra MS11
 Matra MS80
 Matra MS84
 Matra MS120
 Matra MS120B
 Matra MS120C
 Matra MS120D
 Matra MS610
 Matra MS620
 Matra MS630
 Matra-Simca MS630
 Matra-Simca MS630/650
 Matra MS640
 Matra-Simca MS650
 Matra-Simca MS660
 Matra-Simca MS660C
 Matra-Simca MS670
 Matra-Simca MS670B
 Matra-Simca MS670C
 Matra-Simca MS680

Successes

 334 races, all categories, spanning 10 years
 124 victories, 104 lap records
 1 Formula One World Drivers' Championship (1969, Jackie Stewart, MS80)
 1 Formula One World Constructors' Championship (1969, Matra-Elf International)
 5 French Formula Two Championships (1966–1967–1968–1969–1970)
 3 European Formula Two Championships (1967–1968–1969)
 3 French Formula Three Championships (1965–1966–1967)
 2 World Championship for Makes (1973–1974)
 3 victories at 24 Hours of Le Mans (1972–1973–1974)
 2 victories at Tour de France Automobile (1970–1971)

Complete Formula One World Championship results

As a constructor
(key)

As an engine supplier
(key)

Notes

References

External links
 http://www.matrasport.dk/
 http://www.epaf.fr Restoration & rebuild of Matra competition cars

Formula One constructors
Formula Two constructors
Formula One entrants
Formula Two entrants
French Formula 3 teams
24 Hours of Le Mans teams
World Sportscar Championship teams
French auto racing teams
French racecar constructors
Auto racing teams established in 1965
Auto racing teams disestablished in 1979
Matra